Uaçá River is a river of Amapá state in Brazil. It is a tributary of the Oiapoque River. The town of Kumarumã is located on the river.

References

Brazilian Ministry of Transport

Rivers of Amapá